The Fifth Essence: The Search for the Dark Matter in the Universe is the debut book by the American physicist Lawrence M. Krauss, published in 1989. Krauss talks about dark matter and its importance to our understanding of the universe. The book also contains information about modern astrophysics and Greek philosophers. The book was later updated and re-released as Quintessence: The Search for Missing Mass in the Universe in 2000.

References

External links

1989 non-fiction books
Popular physics books
Books by Lawrence M. Krauss